is a passenger railway station in located in the city of Miyazu, Kyoto Prefecture, Japan, operated by the private railway company Willer Trains (Kyoto Tango Railway).

Lines
Kunda Station is a station of the Miyazu Line, and is located 20.2 kilometers from the terminus of the line at Nishi-Maizuru Station.

Station layout
The station consists of two opposed ground-level side platforms connected by a footbridge. The station is attended.

Platforms

Adjacent stations

History
The station was opened on April 12, 1924.

Passenger statistics
In fiscal 2019, the station was used by an average of 183 passengers daily.

Surrounding area
 Japan National Route 178
Kurita beach
Kyoto Prefectural Kaiyo High School

See also
List of railway stations in Japan

References

External links

Official home page 

Railway stations in Kyoto Prefecture
Railway stations in Japan opened in 1924
Miyazu, Kyoto